The Changbai Mountains (simplified Chinese:长白山; traditional Chinese:長白山) are a major mountain range in Northeast Asia that extends from the Northeast Chinese provinces of Heilongjiang, Jilin and Liaoning, across the border between China and North Korea (41°41' to 42°51'N; 127°43' to 128°16'E), to the North Korean provinces of Ryanggang and Chagang. They are also referred to as the Šanggiyan Mountains in Manchu. Most peaks exceed  in height．

History
The mountain was first recorded in the Classic of Mountains and Seas under the name Buxian Shan. It is also called Shanshan Daling in the Book of the Later Han. In the New Book of Tang, it was called Taibai Shan. The current Chinese name Changbai Shan was first used in the Liao dynasty (916–1125) of the Khitans and then the Jin dynasty (1115–1234) of the Jurchens.

The range represents the mythical birthplace of Bukūri Yongšon, ancestor of Nurhaci and the Aisin Gioro imperial family, who were the founders of the Qing dynasty of China. The Chinese name literally means "Perpetually-White Mountain Region".

The Qing emperor Hong Taiji claimed that their progenitor, Bukūri Yongšon (布庫里雍順), was conceived from a virgin birth. According to the legend, three heavenly maidens, namely Enggulen (恩古倫), Jenggulen (正古倫) and Fekulen (佛庫倫), were bathing at a lake called Bulhūri Omo near the Changbai Mountains. A magpie dropped a piece of red fruit near Fekulen, who ate it. She then became pregnant with Bukūri Yongšon. However, another older version of the story by the Hurha (Hurka) tribe member Muksike recorded in 1635 contradicts Hongtaiji's version on location, claiming that it was in Heilongjiang province close to the Amur river at Bukuri mountain where Bulhuri lake was located where the "heavenly maidens" took their bath. Nowadays the famous Yabuli Ski Resort is located in the Changbai Mountains.

Geography and climate
The mountains are the source of the Songhua, Tumen, and Yalu Rivers.

The Changbai Mountains are characterized by long, cold winters.

Flora and fauna

The vegetation of the mountain slopes is divided into several different zones. At the top, above , tundra predominates. From , vegetation is dominated by mountain birch and larch. From , the landscape is dominated by mixed forest consisting of Amur linden (Tilia amurensis), pine, maple, and elm. Further down, a temperate hardwood forest is found, dominated by second-growth poplar and birch.

There are five known species of plants in the lake on the peak, and some 168 have been counted along its shores. The forest on the Chinese side is ancient and almost unaltered by humans. Birch predominates near the tree line, and pine lower down, mixed with other species. There has been extensive deforestation on the lower slopes on the North Korean side of the mountain.

The area is a known habitat for Siberian tigers, bears, wolves, and wild boars. The Ussuri dholes may have been extirpated from the area. Many wild birds such as black grouse, owls, and woodpecker are known to inhabit the area. The mountain has been identified by BirdLife International as an Important Bird Area (IBA) because it supports a population of scaly-sided mergansers.

Protected areas
Longwanqun National Forest Park

See also

Baekdu Mountain
Changbai Waterfall
List of mountains in China

References

External links

Baekdu mountain at changbaimountain.com   

Mountain ranges of China
Mountain ranges of North Korea
Manchuria
Landforms of Heilongjiang
Landforms of Jilin
Landforms of Liaoning
Chagang Province
Ryanggang
Geography of Yanbian
Geography of Northeast Asia
Songhua River
Biosphere reserves of China